Rocío Lorena Mora Restrepo (born 25 December 1989) is an Ecuadorian footballer who plays as a left back and a forward. She has been a member of the Ecuador women's national team.

International career
Mora capped for Ecuador at senior level during the 2010 South American Women's Football Championship.

References

External links

1989 births
Living people
Footballers from Quito
Women's association football fullbacks
Women's association football forwards
Ecuadorian women's footballers
Ecuador women's international footballers
Ecuadorian women's futsal players
21st-century Ecuadorian women